Ohio's 13th senatorial district has been based in metropolitan Lorain, Ohio and consists of all of the counties of Huron and Lorain. It encompasses Ohio House districts 55, 56 and 57. It has a Cook PVI of D+5.  Its Ohio Senator is Republican Nathan Manning.  He resides in North Ridgeville, a city located in Lorain County.

List of senators

References

External links
Ohio's 13th district senator at the 130th Ohio General Assembly official website

Ohio State Senate districts